Mimoun "Simon" Ouaali (born 8 January 1967) is a Moroccan–Dutch football manager. He has coached Chabab Rif Al Hoceima in Morocco and VVZ '49, Sparta Nijkerk, SV Argon and DVS' 33 in the Netherlands. Ouaali received the Rinus Michels Award after the team he managed, Sparta Nijkerk, won a championship in the Hoofdklasse. His younger brother, Saïd Ouaali, is head cach of the Ajax Youth Academy.

Coaching career 
Following Nijkerk, Ouaali managed VVZ '49 for a second run and Hoofdklasse fixture SV Argon. He was fired from coaching Argon in January 2018. He coached Chabab Rif Al Hoceima in the Botola from 1 March to 10 September 2018. In November 1999, he became the manager of Ermelo-side DVS '33 in the Derde Divisie. DVS '33 signed another coach for summer 2020.

References

External links 
 Simon Ouaali at The Other Businessman

1967 births
Living people
Dutch football managers
Moroccan football managers
Dutch sportspeople of Moroccan descent
Rinus Michels Award winners
People from Nador Province
Sparta Nijkerk managers
SV Argon managers